Nevzat Ayaz (born 1930, Çankırı) is a former Turkish civil servant and True Path Party politician. He was governor of Istanbul Province from 1979 to 1988. He was elected to the Grand National Assembly of Turkey in 1991, and was Minister of Defence (1991 - 1993) and Minister of Education (1993 - 1995).

Ayaz featured in Mehmet Eymür's controversial 1987 MIT Report that wrote about high-ranking civil servants and politicians such as Ayaz, Ünal Erkan and Mehmet Ağar, alleging connections with the Turkish mafia.

References 

1930 births
People from Çankırı
Living people
Democrat Party (Turkey, current) politicians
Deputies of Çankırı
Turkish police chiefs
Turkish civil servants
Ministers of National Defence of Turkey
Ministers of National Education of Turkey
Governors of Istanbul
Members of the 49th government of Turkey
Members of the 50th government of Turkey